Eamon Courtenay (born 11 June 1960) is a Belizean politician from the People's United Party. He has been Minister of Foreign Affairs since 13 November 2020. He previously served in the same role from 2006 to 2007.

Family 
His father Vernon Harrison Courtenay served as Minister of Foreign Affairs in the 1980s.

References 

1960 births
Living people
People's United Party politicians
21st-century Belizean politicians

Foreign ministers of Belize